California's 3rd State Senate district is one of 40 California State Senate districts. It is currently represented by Democrat Bill Dodd of Napa.

District profile 
The district stretches over the northern San Francisco Bay Area and the southern Sacramento Valley. It includes parts of the North Bay, Wine Country, and the Sacramento–San Joaquin River Delta.

Contra Costa County – 7.6%
 Martinez
 Pleasant Hill

All of Napa County
 American Canyon
 Calistoga
 Napa
 St. Helena
 Yountville

Sacramento County – 0.6%
 Isleton
 Walnut Grove

All of Solano County
 Benicia
 Dixon
 Fairfield
 Rio Vista
 Suisun City
 Vacaville
 Vallejo

Sonoma County – 28.5%
 Cotati
 Petaluma
 Rohnert Park
 Sonoma

Yolo County – 75.7%
 Davis
 Winters
 Woodland

Election results from statewide races

List of state senators 
Due to redistricting, the 3rd district has been moved around different parts of the state. The current iteration resulted from the 2011 redistricting by the California Citizens Redistricting Commission.

Election results 1992 - present

2020

2016

2012

2008

2004

2000

1996

1992

See also 
 California State Senate
 California State Senate districts
 Districts in California

References

External links 
 District map from the California Citizens Redistricting Commission

03
Government of Contra Costa County, California
Government of Napa County, California
Government of Sacramento County, California
Government of Solano County, California
Government of Sonoma County, California
Government of Yolo County, California
Benicia, California
Davis, California
Fairfield, California
Martinez, California
Napa, California
Petaluma, California
Pleasant Hill, California
Rohnert Park, California
Sonoma, California
St. Helena, California
Vacaville, California
Vallejo, California
Winters, California
Woodland, California
Yountville, California